Dismas Becker (September 16, 1936 – September 19, 2010) was an American Democratic politician, civil rights activist, and former Discalced Carmelite friar and Catholic priest from Wisconsin.

Life and career
Born Paul Vincent Becker in 1936 in Milwaukee, Wisconsin, after graduating from high school he entered the Order of Discalced Carmelites, where he received the religious name of Dismas, named for the Good Thief depicted in the New Testament at the Crucifixion of Jesus. He had his name changed legally in 1986. He graduated from St. Francis Seminary, becoming ordained a priest in 1964, and later earned a Master's degree in Sociology from Marquette University.

In 1969, Becker became involved with the Rev. James Groppi, a fellow Catholic priest and activist leader in the city, in planning a demonstration at the State Capitol to demand action on welfare rights and school reform demands made by the state’s poorest communities. He arrived late to find that, led by Groppi, nearly a thousand activists from Milwaukee had occupied the State Assembly chamber and much of the rest of the Capitol. Groppi was arrested, leaving Becker the de facto leader of the protest. Becker proceeded to lead a protest on the lawn of the capitol several days later, at which he was beaten by a police officer.

In 1972 Becker helped to edit and publish a book giving voice to the poor women of the city: Welfare Mothers Speak Out: We Ain't Gonna Shuffle Anymore, the same year that he left his religious Order and the priesthood. He married E. Fay Anderson, an African American mother of four in 1975. He later went on to run for state office, becoming elected and serving in the Wisconsin State Assembly from 1977 until 1989. He was the Majority Leader in the Assembly for the Democratic Party in the mid-1980s.

Becker died of cancer on September 19, 2010.

Notes

1936 births
2010 deaths
Politicians from Milwaukee
Discalced Carmelites
St. Francis Seminary (Wisconsin) alumni
Marquette University alumni
20th-century American Roman Catholic priests
American civil rights activists
Roman Catholic activists
Former members of Catholic religious institutes
Laicized Roman Catholic priests
Roman Catholic Archdiocese of Milwaukee
Democratic Party members of the Wisconsin State Assembly
Deaths from cancer in Wisconsin
Writers from Milwaukee
Catholics from Wisconsin